Sharif ul-Hashim (began reign 17 November 1405) was the regal name of Sharif  Abubakar Abirin Al-Hashmi. He was an Arab-Muslim explorer and the founder of the Sultanate of Sulu. He assumed the political and spiritual leadership of the realm, and was given the title Sultan, and was also the first Sultan of Sulu.

During his reigning era, he promulgated the first Sulu code of laws called Diwan that were based on Quran. He introduced Islamic political institutions and the consolidation of Islam as the state religion.

Origins and personal life
Very little is known about Sharif ul-Hashim's early life. Born in Johore (in present-day Malaysia), his proper name was known to be Sayyid Abu Bakr bin Abirin AlHashmi, while his regal name was known as Paduka Mahasari Maulana al Sultan Sharif ul- Hashim, or "The Master (Paduka) His Majesty (Mahasari), Protector (Maulana) and (al) Sultan (Sultan), Sharif (Sharif) of (ul-) Hashim (Hashim)". [The Sharif of Hashim part is a reference to his nobility as a descendant of Hashim clan, a clan the Islamic prophet Muhammad was a part of.] His regnal name is often shortened to Sharif ul-Hashim.

Abubakar bin Abirin bore the titles Sayyid (alternatively spelled Saiyid, Sayyed, Seyyed, Sayed, Seyed, Syed, Seyd) and Shareef an honorific that denotes he was an accepted descendant of the Islamic prophet Muhammad through both the Imams Hassan and Hussain. His name is also alternatively spelled Sayyid walShareef Abu Bakr ibn Abirin AlHashmi. He was a Najeeb AlTarfayn Sayyid.

The genealogy of Sultan Sharif ul-Hashim describes him as a descendant of Muhammad, through his maternal bloodline, Sayyed Zainul Abidin of Hadhramaut, Yemen, who belongs to the fourteenth generation of Hussain, the grandson of Muhammad.

Descendants
Sultan Sharif Ul-Hashim's offspring include his eldest son Sharif Kamal ud-Din who was also his successor as sultan, reigning in 1480–1505. Sultan Sharif Ala ud-Din, not proclaimed as sultan of Sulu. Sultan Sharif Mu-izz ul-Mutawadi-in, reigning 1527–1548, was a grandson of Sultan Sharif, who succeeded to the throne upon the death of Kamal ud-Din.

See also
 Sharif ‘Ali ibn ‘Ajlan ibn Rumaithah ibn Muhammad
 Sultans of Sulu

References

Sultans of Sulu
Filipino people of Arab descent
Malaysian people of Arab descent
Filipino datus, rajas and sultans
Malaysian royalty
15th-century monarchs in Asia
Year of birth unknown
Year of death unknown
Arab explorers